Azlon is a synthetic textile fiber composed of protein material derived from natural sources such as soy, peanut, milk or corn. Currently it is used in clothing.

Regulation

Canada
Under the Textile Labeling and Advertising Regulations, Section 26(f), Azlon is defined as any fiber made from regenerated protein.

United States
The name "Azlon" is regulated by the Federal Trade Commission, § 303.7(g) Rules and Regulations Under the Textile Fiber Products Identification Act. However, there is currently no domestic production.

Azlon is the common generic name for all man-made protein fibers. Aralac was a registered trademark of Aralac, Inc., a division of National Dairy Products Corporation.  Its production from unrationed skimmed-milk supplies may have contributed to its popularization during the Second World War.

United Kingdom 
Azlon is also a brand of plastic labware. It is a registered trade mark of SciLabware Limited.

See also
 Casein
Milk fiber

References

External links
Meet the Azlons from A to Z: Regenerated & Rejuvenated
Azlon Fiber

Synthetic fibers